The Rambler Classic is an intermediate sized automobile that was built and sold by American Motors Corporation (AMC) from the 1961 through 1966 model years. The Classic took the place of the Rambler Six and Rambler Rebel V-8 names, which were retired at the end of the 1960 model year.

Introduced a six-passenger four-door sedan and station wagon versions, additional body styles were added. Two-door models became available as a "post" sedan in 1963 as well as a sporty pillar-less hardtop. A convertible was also available for 1965 and 1966.

Motor Trend magazine selected AMC's Classic line as Car of the Year award for 1963.

The Rebel name replaced Classic on AMC's completely redesigned intermediate-sized cars for the 1967 model year, and for 1968 the Rambler Rebel line was renamed the AMC Rebel as AMC began the process of phasing out the Rambler marque.

Throughout its life in the AMC model line-up, the Classic was the high-volume seller for the independent automaker.

First generation 

The Rambler was the focus of AMC's management strategy under the leadership of George W. Romney. American Motors designed and built some of the most fuel-efficient, best-styled and well-made cars of the 1950s and 1960s. Their compact cars (for the era) helped AMC to achieve sales and corporate profit successes. In 1961, the Rambler marque ranked in third place among domestic automobile sales behind Chevrolet and Ford.

Ramblers were available in two sizes and built on different automobile platforms. The larger-sized Rambler series was based on a 1956 design and was renamed as the Classic for the 1961 model year to help create a stronger individual identity and contrast from the smaller Rambler American line. American Motors' Edmund E. Anderson designed the new  wheelbase Ramblers "that looked new and fresh, but were in fact inexpensive reskinned models."

1961 

The 1961 Classic featured a new front end with a one-piece, rectangular extruded aluminum grille, new fenders, hood, sculptured door panels, and side trim, as well as one-piece bumpers. Models included the Deluxe, the Super, and the Custom (featuring bucket seats in a four-door sedan). The suggested retail price for the basic Deluxe four-door sedan was US$2,098 and was only $339 more for a station wagon.

In 1961, the Classic was available in either an I6 -  - or with a V8 -  - engine. A lighter by  aluminum block version of the OHV I6 engine, sometimes referred to as the 196, was offered as an option on Deluxe and Super models. The die cast block features iron "sleeves" or cylinder liners with a cast iron alloy cylinder head and produces the same  as the cast iron version. The engine was described as one "wave of the future" in automotive engineering as it points the way to higher production rates and lower costs.

American Motors "defied the detractors" with its emphasis on economical and compact-sized cars achieving a sales total of 370,600 vehicles in 1961, "lifting the Rambler to an unprecedented third place in the charts behind Chevrolet and Ford".

1962 

For the 1962 model year, the Super models were dropped and replaced by a 400 model. Also for 1962, AMC's flagship Ambassador models were shortened to the same  wheelbase as the Classic's at the same time as the V8 engine was no longer available in the Classic models. This meant the Ambassador models were the only models with V8s in the AMC lineup. The two-door sedan bodystyle Rambler Classic was a unique one-year offering for 1962.

The front grille was modified for 1962, but the free-standing Rambler lettering in the lower center remained. The revised rear end received new round tail lamps, while the previous tailfins were "shaved off". Rambler was one of the last cars to incorporate the tail fin design and became one of the first to "do away with them, and to build clean, simple, uncluttered cars." The back door upper window points were also rounded off for 1962.

Starting in 1962, AMC took a leadership role with safer brake systems in all Ramblers featuring twin-circuit brakes, a design offered by only a few cars at that time. Classics with an automatic transmission continued to use push buttons mounted on the left side of the dashboard with a separate sliding pull tab for the "park" position. The cast-iron block six-cylinder engine was standard on Deluxe and Custom models with the aluminum version optional. The 400 received the aluminum block, but the cast-iron was a no-cost option. Other improvements for 1962 included a price cut of $176 on the popular Custom Classic sedan.

The popularity of the compact-sized Classic continued in the face of a dozen new competitors. Sales of the 1962 model year Classics increased by over 56,000 in the first six months compared to the same period in 1961. A Popular Mechanics nationwide survey of owners that had driven a total of  revealed that the Rambler is likeable, easy handling, providing stability and comfortable, roomy ride with low-cost operation. Flaws included inadequate power and poor workmanship. The magazine editors also highlighted that the Classic has approximately the same length as most of the other "compact" cars on the market, but its interior room is equal to the new and larger "family-sized" Ford Failane and Mercury Meteor.

Centaur 
American Motors highlighted the Rambler Centaur at the 1962 Chicago Auto Show on a raised platform in the center of automaker's exhibit area. The car was based on a two-door sedan that did "not look remarkably different from regular production models."

Second generation 

For the 1963 model year, the Rambler Classic line was completely redesigned with subtle body sculpturing. Outgoing design director, Edmund E. Anderson, shaped the Classic that was named Motor Trend magazine's 1963 "Car of the Year." These were also the first AMC models that were influenced by Dick Teague, the company's new principal designer. He "turned these economical cars into smooth, streamlined beauties with tons of options and V-8 pep."

Being of a suitable size for international markets, this Rambler was assembled in a number of countries. In Europe, Renault built this car in their Haren, Belgium plant and marketed it as a luxury car, filling the gap above the tiny Renault Dauphine.

The 1963 Classics were also the first all-new cars developed by AMC since 1956. Keeping the philosophy of the company, they were more compact – shorter and narrower by one inch (25 mm), as well as over two inches (56 mm) lower – than the preceding models; but lost none of their "family-sized" passenger room or luggage capacity featuring a longer  wheelbase.

1963 

American Motors' "senior" cars (Classic and Ambassador) shared the same wheelbase and body parts, with only trim differences and standard equipment levels to distinguish the models. Classics came in pillared two- and four-door sedans, as well as four-door wagons. The model designations now became "a Mercedes-like three-number model designation" going from the lowest 550 (essentially fleet cars), 660, to highest 770 trims (replacing the Deluxe, Custom, and 400 versions).

As in 1962, the 1963 Classics were initially available only as 6-cylinder  models. In addition to higher trim and features, the Ambassador's standard V8 power, featuring AMC's  engine, was a distinguishing feature from the Classic model line.

In mid-1963, a new  V8 option was announced for the Classic models.

The new AMC cars incorporated numerous engineering solutions. Among these was curved side glass, one of the earliest popular-priced cars with this feature. Another engineering breakthrough was combining separate parts in the monocoque (unit construction) body into single stampings. One example was the "uniside" door surround that was made from a single stamping of steel. Not only did it replace 52 parts and reduce weight and assembly costs, but it also increased structural rigidity and provided for better fitting of the doors.

American Motors' imaginative engineering prompted Motor Trend magazine to give the Classic – and the similar Ambassador models – their Car of the Year award for 1963. Motor Trend's "award is based on pure progress in design, we like to make sure the car is also worthy of the title in the critical areas of performance, dependability, value, and potential buyer satisfaction."

1964 

The 1964 model year Classics, were refined with stainless steel rocker moldings, a flush single-plane aluminum grille replacing the previous year's deep concave design, and oval tail lamps replacing the flush-mounted lenses of the 1963's. Classics with bucket seats and a V8 engine could be ordered with a new "Shift-Command" three-speed automatic transmission mounted on the center console providing the driver the ability to manually control shifting.

A new two-door model joined the line only available in the top 770 trim. The pillar-less hardtop offered a large glass area, and "its sales were brisk." The model was the featured on AMC's marketing brochure. A sporty 770-H version featured individually adjustable reclining bucket seats, as well as center a console. The new hardtop body style "added flash. But wagons still accounted for 34 percent of Classic sales."

Consumers continued to perceive Ramblers as economy cars and the six-cylinder models outsold V8-powered versions. Although the Classic had economy-car roots, it offered plenty of space with "clean, unfettered styling that the Sixties brought." American Motors positioned the Classic line to offer near-Chevelle or intermediate-sized proportions with Chevy II small car pricing." Nevertheless, stronger competition from the domestic Big Three automakers meant total Rambler sales dipped in 1964.

Typhoon 

American Motors unveiled the Typhoon in April 1964. This mid-1964 model year introduction was a sporty variant of the Classic 770 2-door hardtop. This special model was introduced to highlight AMC's completely new short-stroke, seven main bearing,  8.5:1 compression ratio  "Typhoon" modern era inline-6.

Production of this commemorative model was limited to 2,520 units and it was only available in a two-tone Solar Yellow body with a Classic Black roof, and a sporty all-vinyl interior for US$2,509. The car also featured a distinctive "Typhoon" script in place of the usual "Classic" name insignia, as well as a unique grille with blackout accents. All other AMC options (except engine choices and colors) were available on the Typhoon.

The engine became the mainstay six-cylinder engine for AMC and Jeep vehicles. It was produced, albeit in a modified form, up until 2006. The 232 I6 engine's name was soon changed to "Torque Command", with Typhoon to describe AMC's new line of V8s introduced in 1966.

Cheyenne 
The 1964 Chicago Auto Show was used by AMC to exhibit the Rambler Cheyenne in a viewing area made from knotty pine planks. The show car was based on the top-of-the-line Classic Cross Country station wagon finished in white highlighting its full-length gold-tone anodized aluminum trim along the upper part of the bodysides (replacing the side spear that was standard on 770 models) as well as matching gold trim on the lower part of the tailgate between the tail-lights. This was one of AMC's concepts displayed at the Chicago Show that included the Rambler Tarpon fastback and the Rambler Carrousel convertible, but the Cheyenne was likely most significant because AMC "did lots of specially trimmed, production-based show cars in its day" given the large number of station wagon models it sold.

Third generation 

The 1965 model year Classics underwent a major redesign of the new platform that was introduced in 1963; essentially the 1963–1964 design with a rectilinear reskin similar to that of concurrent Ambassadors. Unchanged was the suspension system including a torque tube with coil springs with a Panhard rod.

The Rambler Classic was now shorter than – as well as visually distinctive from – the Ambassador line, while still sharing the basic body structure from the windshield back. For the first time, a convertible model was available in the 770 trim version. The two-door sedan was dropped from the 770 model lineup.

1965 

The 1965 Classic models were billed as the "Sensible Spectaculars," with emphasis on their new styling, powerful engines, and their expanded comfort and sports-type options, in contrast to the previous "economy car" image.

American Motors now only offered its modern straight-six engine design, retiring the aging  versions. The 1965 Classic base 550 models featured the modern and economical   six-cylinder, which was basically a destroked 232 engine. The 660 and 770 series received the   six, while a  version was optional.

Popular Science magazine reported, "you can have a 1965 Classic as a penny-pinching economy car or a storming performance job." Additional performance options for 1965 included power front disk brakes with four-piston calipers that were supplied by Bendix. The standard 4-wheel drum brakes also continued to feature AMC's "Double-Safety" master cylinder system. The dual master cylinder was available in only one "Big Three" car: Cadillac.

Marlin 

On March 1, 1965, during the middle of the model year, AMC introduced the Rambler Marlin, a halo car for the company. The fastback design used the Rambler Classic platform. Marketed as a personal luxury car, the Marlin had unique styling and featured an exceptional array of standard equipment.

Rambler Hialeah 
A specially prepared Classic two-door hardtop was campaigned for the 1965 auto show circuit. The exterior was finished in yellow pearlescent paint. It was the interior treatment that differentiated the concept car with its yellow and green "Hialeah Plaid" trim. The door panels and bucket seat bolsters were genuine leather while the seats featured yellow and green plaid silk cloth inserts that were woven in Thailand. The same material was also used for the dresses worn by the models that stood by the cars during auto show days. Public reaction to the tartan interior design was favorable. This market study resulted in AMC offering a new large plaid custom fabric upholstery - along with two matching throw pillows - as an option for the 1966 Classic Rebel hardtop model.

1966 

The 1966 model year Rambler Classics received minor trim changes and additional standard safety features, including padded dash and visors, left outside mirror, as well as seat belts for the front and rear passengers. The 660 mid-trim level was dropped leaving the 550 and 770 models for 1966. Available for the first time was a floor-mounted four-speed manual transmission and a dash-mounted tachometer.

Classics received particular attention to the styling of the roofs for 1966. The two-door hardtop models received a rectangular rear window and a more formal and angular "crisp-line" roofline that could be covered with vinyl trim. Sedans had an optional trim-outlined "halo" roof accent color. The station wagon's roof area over the cargo compartment was at the same level as the rest of the roof, no longer dipped down as in prior years. The wagons carried Cross Country insignia and featured  of cargo space, as well as a standard roof rack. Two wagon seating capacities were available: a standard six-passenger version with two rows of seats with a drop-down bottom-hinged tailgate incorporating a fully retracting rear window for accessing cargo, or in an optional eight-passenger version with three rows of seats (the third rear-facing) and a left-side hinged rear fifth door.

The name Classic was no longer considered a positive factor in the marketplace and AMC began reshuffling model names in 1966.

Rambler Rebel 

A top-of-the-line version of the two-door hardtop Classic was offered under the historic Rambler Rebel name. It replaced the 770-H and featured special badges and standard slim-type bucket seats with optional checked upholstery with two matching pillows. Public reaction to the tartan touch appearing in some of AMC's "Project IV" automobile show tour cars, was judged favorable enough to make the unique trim available on the Rebel hardtop.

Serving as one example to verify how AMC products were sometimes derided by the automotive press, Popular Science magazine wrote that the new "Rambler Rebel reveals a sudden interest in performance," but its handling package cannot overcome the car's obsolete suspension design. However, AMC was reluctant to forfeit their Nash engineered suspension design which employed a strut-type front and a Panhard rod controlled torque tube rear-drive system, both having long coil springs to place the upper spring seats higher into the body of the car. This feature was to afford a softer ride quality and better handling by reducing the geometrical leverage of the car's center of gravity for less body roll "sway" in cornering. What was labeled as "obsolete" is juxtaposed by noting how General Motors employed a similar suspension system on their third generation Camaro and Firebird nearly twenty years later which had MacPherson strut front and a torque arm mounted rear-drive axle.

Rambler St. Moritz 
A customized show car was displayed along production models during the 1966 automobile show circuit, the snow- and ski-themed Rambler St. Moritz station wagon. The wagon with three rows of seats featured tinted rear side "observation" windows that curved up and over into the roof. The remaining roof over the cargo area was finished with polished stainless steel and equipped with a special ski rack. The exterior was a light ice-blue pearlescent paint, while the car's dark blue interior featured Corfam upholstery with a metallic thread embroidered snowflake in each seat back.

International markets 

American Motors was active to direct exports of finished cars from its Canadian and U.S. plantsto independent distributors. Generous discounts were also available to U.S. military and diplomatic service personnel for individual purchase while overseas. More significantly, AMC was directly involved in joint ventures or utilized licensees in several overseas business ventures for the production or distribution of Rambler Classics. The cars were marketed in various international markets.

Argentina 

Industrias Kaiser Argentina (IKA) produced Rambler Classics in Córdoba, Argentina from 1962 through 1971. Throughout its production, the four-door sedan, and station wagon models were produced, with the sedan being sold as the "Classic" and the station wagon being sold by the name "Cross Country." Each car received a numerical nomenclature, depending on the level of equipment: "400", "440", "550", "660" and "990". All were powered by the  overhead camshaft (OHC) straight-six "Tornado Interceptor" engines that were originally developed by Kaiser Motors in the U.S. for the 1963 Jeep Gladiator pickups and Wagoneer vehicles. This engine was later produced in Argentina and increased the domestic (local sourced) content of the automobiles to gain tariff concessions for the imported components from AMC.

In 1963, the best-selling model in Argentina was the IKA Rambler. A road test of an IKA Rambler Classic 660 by the Argentinean automotive magazine, Revista Parabrisas, described significant differences to the 1962 versions, noting the new stylized simple lines and more fluid design, as well as concluding that it is "a large and comfortable ride for both the city and touring, as well as – depending on the driver – can be sporty."

In June 1966 IKA launched a special Taxi version of the Rambler Classic in Buenos Aires. The IKA-modified cars included heavy-duty running gear, vinyl interior, taxi-specific accessories, and were powered with the standard IKA-built "Tornado"  overhead cam (OHC) engine.

Australia 

Rambler Classics were assembled by Australian Motor Industries (AMI) in Australia from 1961. They were built from semi Knock-down (SKD) kits. The vehicles were partially assembled and painted at AMC's Kenosha, Wisconsin, factory. They were built with right-hand drive and the body had the engine, transmission, front suspension, rear axle, and doors installed. Some of the other components were boxed and shipped inside the car for final assembly by AMI. Interior components such as upholstery and various other parts were locally sourced to get import tariff concessions. Australian cars were also fitted with amber rear turn signal lights to comply with safety standards in Australia.

The Australian-assembled versions were identical in appearance to the U.S. models through the three generations. The base prices of Rambler Classics dropped with the introduction of the redesigned 1963 models due to the elimination of some standard equipment such as the reclining front seats and heater. Two four-door body styles were available: sedan and station wagon. A Classic sedan was offered in Australia for the first time with a manual transmission. However, the biggest selling model was the six-cylinder Classic sedan with an automatic transmission. The AMI Rambler Classics exhibited high standards of assembly and finish.

Additionally, the Brampton, Ontario AMC plant in Canada sent 8 fully assembled, right-hand-drive Classic 770 hardtops to Australia in 1964 and 1965.

AMI also acted as the State distributor for Ramblers for Victoria. Rambler sales for New South Wales were managed by Sydney company, Grenville Motors Pty Ltd, which was also the State distributor of Rover and Land Rover. A network of Sydney and country NSW dealers were controlled by Grenville which was in direct communication with AMI.

Australian Capital Territory sales were managed by Betterview Pty Ltd in Canberra. Annand & Thompson Pty Ltd in Brisbane distributed Rambler vehicles for Queensland. South Australian sales were managed by Champions Pty Ltd in Adelaide. Premier Motors Pty Ltd in Perth distributed Ramblers for Western Australia, and Heathco Motors in Launceston distributed Rambler vehicles for Tasmania.

Canada 

American Motors established a vehicle assembly plant in Brampton, Ontario, Canada in 1961 to assemble AMC vehicles for the Canadian market. With Canada being a Commonwealth country, the Brampton plant also undertook to export complete vehicles to right-hand-drive markets including Australia, India, New Zealand, and the United Kingdom. For example, records for the Brampton plant show that 129 RHD Rambler Americans and 255 RHD Rambler Classics were exported in 1964 of which the majority were exported to the United Kingdom.

Chile 
Rambler vehicle assembly began in Chile at the beginning of 1964 under a partnership between AMC and Renault. The Rambler Classic was assembled alongside Renault vehicles at the Indauto plant in Arica. Vehicle production was transferred to Automotores Franco Chilena in Los Andes, Santiago after 1967.

Costa Rica 
Starting in 1959, Purdy Motor, owned by Xavier Quirós Oreamuno, distributed Rambler vehicles in Costa Rica. Many Central and South American nations established local content regulations during the 1960s. These laws effectively required automobiles sold in those markets to be assembled locally from knock-down kits. A new company, ECASA was established in 1964 by Oreamuno, and by September 1965, the first vehicle to be built in Costa Rica was a 1964 Rambler Classic 660 that still exists. The company assembled Rambler Classics until 1969 and other AMC models until 1974, as well as Toyota's Corona and Land Cruiser. By 1973, Toyota acquired 20% of ECASA.

Finland 
Rambler vehicles were imported into Finland by two major Finnish automotive importers, Oy Voimavaunu Ab and Suomen Maanvilelijäin Kauppa Oy (SMK Group.)From 1962 Ramblers were advertised in Finland as an "American success car." The brand's best sales years were 1964 (almost 600 cars) and 1965 (more than 700 cars). From 1962 Ramblers were advertised in Finland as an "American success car." From the mid 1960s, Wihuri Group, a large multi-sector family business, took over import operations using it's shipping operation, Autola Oy. Rambler Classics and Americans were quite common in taxi use. Wihuri continued to import AMC vehicles until 1975.

France (and Europe) 

All three generations of the Rambler Classics were assembled from CKD (Completely Knocked Down) kits by Renault at the Vilvoorde factory in Haren, Belgium beginning in 1962 and sold through Renault dealers in Algeria, Austria, Belgium, France, the Netherlands, and Luxembourg,

The French automaker no longer had a large car after the Renault Frégate in its own model range and the Rambler Classic was chosen for its "European-style" features and sold as an "executive car" in Renault's markets, and badged as the "Rambler Renault", under the terms of a cooperation agreement concluded between the two automakers on 21 November 1961.

The French coach builder, Henri Chapron, modified 1962 Rambler sedans to serve as a presidential limousines for the government of Charles de Gaulle. Modifications included a custom grille and a single chrome strip the full length of the bodyside, a raised roof, as well as the elimination of the stock panoramic rear window by straight back glass framed by large C-pillars. One objective of Renault, the state-owned automaker at the time, was to recapture the French limousine market segment from Citroën. However, de Gaulle selected the slightly less roomy Citroen.

The Classic's successor, the Rambler Rebel, was also built by the Belgium Renault plant for the 1967 year only and was also sold as "Rambler Renault" in France's domestic and export markets.

Mexico 
Willys Mexicana S.A. had agreements with AMC to assemble the compact Rambler American models and began preparing for the introduction of the larger Rambler Classic to the Mexican market in 1963. During this time the automaker became Vehiculos Automotores Mexicanos (VAM). This coincided with the launch of the second generation of the U.S. Classic, and the VAM Classic became the second AMC product made by VAM in Mexico. The new model was focused as the luxury companion to the Rambler American compact line and as VAM's flagship automobile as the Ambassador line was not produced in Mexico. A major marketing campaign by VAM promoted the inaugural 1963 models using Motor Trend's Car of the Year award. The VAM Rambler Classic was a success among consumers and the automotive press; obtaining praise for the car's roominess, comfort, styling, advanced engineering, as well as its economy and value.

The 1963 Rambler Classics were available only in two- and four-door sedan body designs, both called Rambler Classic 660. No other trim levels or versions were available. The standard engine and transmission combination was the OHV  I6 engine with a single barrel carburetor producing  at 4200 rpm with an 8.7:1 compression ratio and coupled to a three-speed manual transmission with column-mounted shifter. The  two-barrel version of the 195.6 six was also available at extra cost. Standard equipment for all included built-in flow-through ventilation, four-wheel drum brakes with twin-circuits and a double master cylinder, manual steering, electric wipers and washers, coil-spring-based suspension, carpeting, front and rear bench seats consisting of foam rubber and coil springs, side marker lights, hazard lights, backup lights, luxury steering wheel with horn ring and "R" emblem, 200 km/h speedometer, fuel and water temperature gauges, dual front ashtrays, cigarette lighter, electric clock, AM radio, rearview mirror, front and rear side armrests, dual rear ashtrays, dual coat hooks, round dome light, padded sun visors, driver's side remote mirror, as well as a bright molding package. Optional equipment included power brakes, power steering, front seatbelts, heater, passenger's side remote mirror, bumper guards, bumper tubes, and full wheel covers.

For 1964, the VAM Rambler Classic incorporated the new styling upgrades from its AMC domestic counterpart models. The two-barrel  version of the 195.6 six became standard.

The 1965 model year followed the styling changes of the U.S. cars. The biggest change was AMC's new seven-main-bearing  I6 engine in  version as standard equipment and a double barrel  version as optional. The new engines were now manufactured in VAM's own factory that was built in 1964 at Lerma, State of Mexico. The new engines replaced the imported L-head and OHV 195.6 engines in VAM's vehicles.

The cars saw a name change for 1966, from Rambler Classic 660 to Rambler Classic 770. Despite the "trim level" upgrade, the car was mostly the same. The cars became progressively more luxurious over the years. The two-door Rambler Classic 770 featured individual reclining front seats and its marketing focused on sportiness, marking for the first time a difference between the two body styles other than their number of doors.

The VAM Rambler Classic was not available in Mexico as a two-door hardtop, two-door convertible, or four-door station wagon. The Rambler Classic-based Marlin fastbacks were also not produced under VAM as also were not the 1963-1964 Ambassador models based on the same platform. The Rambler Classic model enjoyed popularity and a positive image among the Mexican public. For this reason in 1967, with the arrival of AMC's completely new Rebel line in the mid-size market segment, VAM continued the Rambler Classic name. It went well into the 1970s, by which that time VAM Rambler Classic was now the AMC Matador.

New Zealand 

Rambler Classics were assembled by New Zealand company VW Motors in their Volkswagen assembly plant in Otahuhu, Auckland until 1962.

In 1964 Campbell Motors, the importer of Studebaker and Willys vehicles, built a plant in Thames, New Zealand to assemble AMC vehicles. The assembly business was named Campbell Motor Industries (CMI). CMI assembled Peugeots and Ramblers and later Hino, Isuzu, Renault, Datsun, and Toyota. The first Rambler to come off the line was a Rambler Classic in September 1964. 

Like Australia, New Zealand cars were assembled from right-hand drive knock-down kits from Kenosha. The vehicles were partially assembled and painted at the factory with the engine, transmission, front suspension, rear axle, and doors installed. Some of the other components were boxed and shipped inside the car for final assembly by CMI. Unlike Australia, interior trim was also supplied with the knock-down kits, as the motor trimming industry in New Zealand had ceased to exist since the end of the 1930s following the demise of local coach building due to the preference of full imports. Hence, New Zealand assembled Ramblers are more "American" than their Australian equivalents. For 1966, CMI assembled 336 Rambler Classics for the New Zealand market, only slightly fewer than the Datsuns and Peugeots they also assembled in the same year.

Norway
Ramblers were imported into Norway during the 1950s and 1960s by Norwegian importer Kolberg & Caspary AS located at Ås, Norway. Kolberg & Caspary was formed in 1906 and imported automotive, industrial, and construction products. The Rambler Classic was imported from 1963 until 1966, with the majority between 1963 and 1965. A total of 558 cars were brought into Norway by 1966. Rambler Ambassadors, Americans, and Rebels were also imported in small numbers.

Peru
Ramblers were marketed in Peru during the 1960s by Rambler del Peru S.A that were sold and serviced by a network of 13 dealers. In January 1966, Renault and AMC created Industria Automotriz Peruana S.A. to locally assemble Renault, AMC, and Peugeot vehicles. Only small numbers were produced of all three brands with AMC vehicles amounting to 750 built between 1966 and 1970, including the Rambler Classic.

Philippines 
While the Philippines was almost exclusively an American car market until 1941, the post-World War II years saw an influx of European cars enter the market. Despite a saturation of international brands, American Motors Corporation managed to establish a presence and the Rambler Classic and Rambler American were locally assembled by Luzon Machineries Inc. in Manila during the 1960s.

United Kingdom 
The Rambler Classic and Rambler American were first imported into the U.K by London company, Nash Concessionaires Ltd. Nash Concessionaires had previously been the U.K importer of Nash vehicles. U.K vehicles were imported in factory right-hand drive from the Brampton plant in Canada. The dash plaque read “Rambler of Canada." The company also was involved in the export of the British-built Nash Metropolitan to the United States. The 1961 Classic '6' saloon (sedan) sold for £1798 and the Classic station wagon sold for £1963.

Rambler Motors (A.M.C) Ltd of Chiswick in West London, had assembled Hudson motor vehicles for the U.K market since 1926. The operation became a subsidiary of AMC in 1961 and changed its name to Rambler Motors (A.M.C) Ltd in 1966. Rambler Motors went on to import factory right-hand-drive AMC vehicles from 1961 and into the 1970s. Parts and spares were supplied locally out of the Chiswick service center located on Great West Road for the whole of the United Kingdom, Europe, and the Middle East. In addition to Rambler parts, the stock of spares also covered Hudson, Nash, and Austin Metropolitan parts.

Venezuela 
Ramblers were assembled in Venezuela from May 1963 under a partnership between the Venezuelan government, AMC, and Renault. Partnerships with AMC to locally build AMC vehicles continued throughout the 1960s and early 1970s and as with all export markets vehicles continued to be branded in Venezuela as "Rambler" even after the brand was dropped by AMC after 1969.

Owners 
Former U.S. presidential candidate, Mitt Romney, received his first car in 1965 while he was as a student at Brigham Young University, a used 1963 Rambler Classic from his father, AMC President George W. Romney.

Collectibility 
Rambler Classics share numerous parts and components with other AMC models. New parts are somewhat plentiful and several vendors specialize in AMCs. There are also active AMC car clubs to assist owners. "Long admired for their simplicity, utilitarian design approach and servicing ease, Ramblers of the early-1960s are an inexpensive way to get into the collector-car hobby."

Among the most collectible models are the 1964 Typhoon hardtop and the 1965–1966 Rambler Classic hardtops and convertibles. At collector auctions, Rambler Classics that are in original condition, such as a low-mileage 1965 convertible, will see bidding soaring "above condition #1 values" with "their continued popularity".

References

Citations

General references

External links 

 The American Motors Owners Association
 The AMC Rambler Car Club
 The Renault Rambler Car Club
 The Nash Car Club
 Ramblers History on amcrc.com
 AMCyclopedia AMC/Rambler History/Documentation Site
 
 
 

AMC vehicles
Classic
Rear-wheel-drive vehicles
Mid-size cars
Coupés
Convertibles
Sedans
Station wagons
Cars introduced in 1961